Douglas Johnston may refer to:
Douglas Johnston, Lord Johnston (1907–1985), Scottish politician and judge
Douglas H. Johnston (1856–1939), Governor of the Chickasaw Nation
Doug Johnston, curler, see 2012 The Dominion Tankard

See also
Douglas Johnstone (disambiguation)
Douglas Johnson (disambiguation)